Skye McCole Bartusiak (September 28, 1992 – July 19, 2014) was an American child actress and child model. She appeared in The Patriot (2000), Don't Say a Word (2001), as Rose Wilder in Beyond the Prairie: The True Story of Laura Ingalls Wilder (2002), as Megan Matheson on season 2 of 24 (2002–03), Boogeyman (2005), and Kill Your Darlings (2006).

Early life
Skye McCole Bartusiak was born in Houston, Texas, where she lived with her parents, Helen (née McCole) and Donald Bartusiak, until her death.

She attended St. Thomas Episcopal Academy and Lutheran South High School in Houston, and graduated from Laurel Springs High School in Ojai, California in 2010.

Career
Bartusiak first starred in Stephen King's Storm of the Century as young Pippa Hatcher. In 2000, she appeared in The Patriot as the youngest child of a militia leader portrayed by Mel Gibson. She played the young Marilyn Monroe in the TV miniseries Blonde, and the psychiatrist's daughter in Don't Say a Word alongside Michael Douglas and Brittany Murphy, both in 2001. She also played young Charlie McGee in Firestarter: Rekindled and Megan Matheson during season two of the television series 24 (2002–2003).

Bartusiak made an appearance in the short film The Vest in 2003 and played the part of The Girl in Once Not Far from Home in 2005. She also tried her hand at theatre, playing in The Miracle Worker alongside Hilary Swank at the Charlotte Repertory Theatre in North Carolina.

In 2003, Bartusiak returned to period drama with Love Comes Softly, and a year later she played young Jackie in Against the Ropes alongside Meg Ryan. In 2005, she received main billing for her role as Franny Roberts in the hit horror film Boogeyman. She starred in the "Kids" episode of hospital drama series House, and took a lead role as Sunshine in the 2006 film Kill Your Darlings, playing a troubled teen willing to do anything to get the attention of her busy father.

Death
On July 19, 2014, Bartusiak died at the age of 21 in her apartment behind her parents' Houston home. While her mother, shortly after Bartusiak's death, stated she believed that her daughter's history of epileptic seizures may have had a role in her death, the coroner ruled the death resulted from an accidental drug overdose.

Her mother told CNN and the Associated Press that Skye's boyfriend found the actress sitting up in her bed; Helen began CPR on her daughter before the arrival of paramedics, who then worked "for 45 minutes" to resuscitate her. Her mother said Skye "had been healthy and did not drink or do drugs", but had recently been experiencing epileptic seizures; she believed that this fact had likely played a role in her daughter's death. A memorial service was held in Houston six days later; her brother Stephen told mourners: "If you want to know what makes Skye happy, go out and plant a tree."

The Harris County Institute of Forensic Sciences ruled in October 2014 that Bartusiak's death was an accident. The "combined toxic effects of hydrocodone and difluoroethane with carisoprodol" were listed as the main cause of death.

Filmography

References

External links

1992 births
2014 deaths
20th-century American actresses
21st-century American actresses
Accidental deaths in Texas
Actresses from Houston
American child actresses
American film actresses
American television actresses
Deaths from epilepsy
Drug-related deaths in Texas
People with epilepsy